Olin Ross Howland (February 10, 1886 – September 20, 1959) was an American film and theatre actor.

Life and career 
Howland was born in Denver, Colorado, to Joby A. Howland, one of the youngest enlisted participants in the Civil War, and Mary C. Bunting. His sister was stage actress Jobyna Howland.

From 1909 to 1927, Howland appeared on Broadway in musicals, occasionally performing in silent films.  The musicals include Leave It to Jane (1917), Two Little Girls in Blue (1921) and Wildflower (1923). He was in the film Janice Meredith (1924) with Marion Davies. With the advent of sound films, his theatre background proved an asset, and he concentrated mostly on films thereafter, appearing in nearly two hundred movies between 1918 and 1958.

Howland often played eccentric and rural roles in Hollywood. His parts were often small and uncredited, and he never got a leading role. He was a personal favorite of David O. Selznick, who cast him in his movies Nothing Sacred (1937) as a strange luggage man, The Adventures of Tom Sawyer (1938, as the teacher Mr. Dobbins) and Gone with the Wind (1939) as a carpetbagger businessman. He also played in numerous westerns from Republic Pictures, including the John Wayne films In Old California (1942) and Angel and the Badman (1947). As a young man, Howland learned to fly at the Wright Flying School and soloed on a Wright Model B. This lent special sentiment in his scenes with James Stewart in the film The Spirit of St. Louis (1957), as Stewart was also a pilot in real life. The Spirit of St. Louis and Them! (1954), where he played a drunken old man, and The Blob (1958), were his last films.

He also played in television shows during the 1950s. One of Olin's memorable television appearances was in an episode of "I Love Lucy." Entitled "First Stop", air date January 17, 1955 Olin played the humorous role of a cafe and motel proprietor offering dubious accommodations to the road-weary Ricardos and Mertzes as they traveled by car en-route from New York to California. In 1958 and 1959, he was cast as Charley Perkins in five episodes of ABC's sitcom The Real McCoys, starring Walter Brennan.

Howland was also a dancer, a dancing teacher, and a headliner in vaudeville shows. He toured Europe performing dancing exhibitions.

Howland never married and had no children. He worked until his death in Hollywood, California, at the age of 73.

Selected filmography 

 The Great White Way (1924) - Stubbs
 Janice Meredith (1924) - Philemon Hennion
 Zander the Great (1925) - Elmer Lovejoy
 Over the Hill (1931) - Isaac as an Adult
 Cheaters at Play (1932) - Secretary
 So Big (1932) - Jacob Pogadunk (uncredited)
 Blondie Johnson (1933) - Eddie
 Golden Harvest (1933) - Wheat Farmer (uncredited)
 Little Women (1933) - Mr. Davis (uncredited)
 Private Scandal (1934) - Ed, Coroner
 Treasure Island (1934) - Pirate of the Spanish Main
 Wagon Wheels (1934) - Bill O'Leary
 Marie Galante (1934) - Clerk French Consul (uncredited)
 Behold My Wife (1934) - Mattingly (uncredited)
 Under Pressure (1935) - Newspaper Reporter (uncredited)
 Folies Bergère de Paris (1935) - Stage Manager
 Naughty Marietta (1935) - Minor Role (uncredited)
 The Case of the Curious Bride (1935) - Coroner Wilbur Strong
 Love Me Forever (1935) - Carlton - Interior Decorator (uncredited)
 Little Big Shot (1935) - Doc - Kells' Henchman (uncredited)
 The Case of the Lucky Legs (1935) - Dr. Croker
 Dr. Socrates (1935) - Bob Catlett
 The Widow from Monte Carlo (1935) - Eaves
 Man Hunt (1936) - Starrett
 Road Gang (1936) - Doctor
 Snowed Under (1936) - Bridgeport Sheriff (uncredited)
 I Married a Doctor (1936) - Dave Dyer
 The Big Noise (1936) - Harrison
 Satan Met a Lady (1936) - Detective Dunhill
 Earthworm Tractors (1936) - Mr. Blair
 The Case of the Velvet Claws (1936) - Wilbur Strong
 The Longest Night (1936) - Smythe, Floorwalker
 Love Letters of a Star (1936)
 Country Gentlemen (1936) - Lawyer
 Gold Diggers of 1937 (1936) - Dr. MacDuffy
 Men in Exile (1937) - H. Mortimer Jones
 A Star Is Born (1937) - Judd Baker (uncredited)
 Mountain Music (1937) - Pappy Burnside
 Marry the Girl (1937) - First Southerner
 Stella Dallas (1937) - Stephen's Office Clerk (uncredited)
 Wife, Doctor and Nurse (1937) - Doorman Jim
 Stand-In (1937) - Hotel Manager (uncredited)
 Nothing Sacred (1937) - Vermont Baggage Man
 The Bad Man of Brimstone (1937) - Jardge - Stage Driver (uncredited)
 Swing Your Lady (1938) - Hotel Proprietor
 The Adventures of Tom Sawyer (1938) - Mr. Dobbins - Schoolmaster
 Merrily We Live (1938) - Jed Smith (uncredited)
 The Girl of the Golden West (1938) - Trinidad Joe
 Mr. Moto's Gamble (1938) - Deputy Sheriff Burt (uncredited)
 A Trip to Paris (1938) - Fred (uncredited)
 Kentucky Moonshine (1938) - Tom Slack
 When Were You Born (1938) - Peter Finlay (Sagittarius)
 Little Tough Guy (1938) - Baxter
 The Mad Miss Manton (1938) - Mr. X
 Brother Rat (1938) - Slim
 Sweethearts (1938) - Appleby
 Ambush (1939) - Radio Actor (segment "Uncle Toby") (uncredited)
 Boy Slaves (1939) - 'Cookie' the Camp Cook (uncredited)
 Made for Each Other (1939) - Farmer (uncredited)
 Nancy Drew... Reporter (1939) - Police Sgt. Entwhistle
 Zenobia (1939) - Attorney Culpepper
 The Kid from Kokomo (1939) - Sam, the Whittler (uncredited)
 One Hour to Live (1939) - Clerk
 Blondie Brings Up Baby (1939) - Encyclopedia Salesman
 The Return of Doctor X (1939) - Undertaker
 Gone with the Wind (1939) - A carpetbagger businessman
 Days of Jesse James (1939) - Muncie Undersheriff
 Four Wives (1939) - Joe - a Policeman (uncredited)
 Young Tom Edison (1940) - Telegrapher (Indian Attack) (uncredited)
 The Doctor Takes a Wife (1940) - Hotel Clerk (uncredited)
 Comin' Round the Mountain (1940) - Pa Blower
 Young People (1940) - Station Master
 Chad Hanna (1940) - Cisco Tridd
 The Great Lie (1941) - Ed - Arizona Ranch Hand (scenes deleted)
 The Shepherd of the Hills (1941) - Corky
 Belle Starr (1941) - Jasper Trench
 One Foot in Heaven (1941) - Train Station Master (uncredited)
 Buy Me That Town (1941) - Constable Sam Smedley
 Ellery Queen and the Murder Ring (1941) - Dr. Williams
 Two-Faced Woman (1941) - Frank (uncredited)
 You're in the Army Now (1941) - Pa - The Farmer (uncredited)
 Mr. and Mrs. North (1942) - Minor Role (scenes deleted)
 Sappy Birthday (1942, Short) - Mr. Plantem, Cemetery Plot Salesman
 Blondie's Blessed Event (1942) - Office Worker (uncredited)
 This Gun for Hire (1942) - Blair Fletcher
 The Man Who Wouldn't Die (1942) - Chief of Police Jonathan Meek
 Home in Wyomin' (1942) - Sunrise
 Dr. Broadway (1942) - The Professor
 Almost Married (1942) - Bright
 In Old California (1942) - Salesman (uncredited)
 Ten Gentlemen from West Point (1942) - Carpenter (uncredited)
 Henry and Dizzy (1942) - Mr. Stevens
 Joan of Ozark (1942) - Game Warden (uncredited)
 Her Cardboard Lover (1942) - Frank - Casino Manager (uncredited)
 Orchestra Wives (1942) - Dance Ticket-Taker (uncredited)
 Mrs. Wiggs of the Cabbage Patch (1942) - Jacob Diezal (uncredited)
 You Can't Escape Forever (1942) - Cemetery Organist (uncredited)
 Secrets of the Underground (1942) - Oscar Mayberry
 When Johnny Comes Marching Home (1942) - Trullers
 Ridin' Down the Canyon (1942) - The Jailer
 Lady Bodyguard (1943) - Dr. Saunders
 Young and Willing (1943) - Second Cop
 The Falcon Strikes Back (1943) - Sheriff (uncredited)
 A Stranger in Town (1943) - Homer Todds
 Dixie (1943) - Mr. Deveraux
 The Sky's the Limit (1943) - Driver (uncredited)
 The Good Fellows (1943) - Reynolds
 The Falcon and the Co-eds (1943) - Goodwillie, Bluecliff Driver
 Jack London (1943) - Mailman (uncredited)
 Twilight on the Prairie (1944) - Jed
 Bermuda Mystery (1944) - Gas Station Owner
 The Adventures of Mark Twain (1944) - Riverboat Southerner (uncredited)
 Man from Frisco (1944) - Eben Whelock
 Goodnight, Sweetheart (1944) - Slim Taylor
 Allergic to Love (1944) - Sam Walker
 Sing, Neighbor, Sing (1944) - Joe the Barber
 In the Meantime, Darling (1944) - J.P. 'Hiram' Morehousse (uncredited)
 And Now Tomorrow (1944) - Customer (uncredited)
 I'll Be Seeing You (1944) - Train Vendor (uncredited)
 Nothing but Trouble (1944) - Painter's Foreman (uncredited)
 The Town Went Wild (1944) - Bit Part
 Can't Help Singing (1944) - Bigelow
 She Gets Her Man (1945) - Hank (uncredited)
 Grissly's Millions (1945) - Andrews (uncredited)
 Her Lucky Night (1945) - Prince de la Mour
 Sheriff of Cimarron (1945) - Pinky Snyder
 It's in the Bag! (1945) - Dr. Greengrass's Doctor (uncredited)
 Santa Fe Saddlemates (1945) - Dead Eye
 Captain Eddie (1945) - Census Taker
 Incendiary Blonde (1945) - Interior Decorator (uncredited)
 Senorita from the West (1945) - Justice of Peace
 Fallen Angel (1945) - Joe Ellis (uncredited)
 Sing Your Way Home (1945) - Zany Steward (uncredited)
 Dakota (1945) - Devlin's Driver
 Colonel Effingham's Raid (1946) - Painter (uncredited)
 She Wrote the Book (1946) - Baggage Master (uncredited)
 The Strange Love of Martha Ivers (1946) - Newspaper Clerk (uncredited)
 Home Sweet Homicide (1946) - Luke (uncredited)
 Three Wise Fools (1946) - Witness (uncredited)
 Crime Doctor's Man Hunt (1946) - Marcus Le Blaine (uncredited)
 Easy Come, Easy Go (1947) - Gas Man (uncredited)
 Angel and the Badman (1947) - Bradley
 Apache Rose (1947) - Alkali Elkins
 For the Love of Rusty (1947) - Frank Foley (uncredited)
 Living in a Big Way (1947) - The Morgan Gardener (uncredited)
 The Trouble with Women (1947) - Mr. Pink (uncredited)
 Keeper of the Bees (1947) - Customer
 Wyoming (1947) - Cowboy Wanting Herd (uncredited)
 The Fabulous Texan (1947) - McGinn - Storekeeper (uncredited)
 I Walk Alone (1947) - Ed the Watchman (uncredited)
 Relentless (1948) - Horse Doctor (uncredited)
 The Return of the Whistler (1948) - Jeff Anderson (uncredited)
 My Dog Rusty (1948) - Frank Foley (uncredited)
 The Dude Goes West (1948) - Finnegan
 Station West (1948) - Cook
 Isn't It Romantic? (1948) - Hotel Clerk (uncredited)
 Smoky Mountain Melody (1948) - Lum Peters
 The Paleface (1948) - Jonathan Sloane, undertaker
 Last of the Wild Horses (1948) - Remedy Williams
 Bad Men of Tombstone (1949) - Store Proprietor
 Little Women (1949) - Mr. Davis - Schoolteacher (uncredited)
 A Connecticut Yankee in King Arthur's Court (1949) - Sam, the Postman (uncredited)
 Grand Canyon (1949) - Windy
 Hellfire (1949) - Bartender (uncredited)
 Leave It to Henry (1949) - Milo Williams
 Anna Lucasta (1949) - Station Master (uncredited)
 Mr. Soft Touch (1949) - Skinny Santa Claus (uncredited)
 Top o' the Morning (1949) - Barfly (uncredited)
 The Nevadan (1950) - Rusty (uncredited)
 A Ticket to Tomahawk (1950) - Railway Conductor (uncredited)
 Rock Island Trail (1950) - Saloonkeeper
 Father Makes Good (1950) - Milo Williams
 Never a Dull Moment (1950) - Hunter (uncredited)
 He's a Cockeyed Wonder (1950) - Hotel Clerk (uncredited)
 Stage to Tucson (1950) - Chantry (uncredited)
 Charlie's Haunt (1950) - Storyteller on Bench
 Santa Fe (1951) - Dan Dugan
 Fighting Coast Guard (1951) - Desk Clerk
 The Fabulous Senorita (1952) - Justice of the Peace
 Gobs and Gals (1952) - Conductor
 So This Is Love (1953) - Mailman (uncredited)
 Them! (1954) - Jensen
 A Star is Born (1954) - Charley (uncredited)
 The McConnell Story (1955) - Sam - Postman (uncredited)
 The Storm Rider (1957) - Will Collins
 The Spirit of St. Louis (1957) - Surplus Dealer (uncredited)
 Bombers B-52 (1957) - Joe (uncredited)
 The Blob (1958) - Old Man

References

External links

1886 births
1959 deaths
American male film actors
Male actors from Denver
20th-century American male actors
Vaudeville performers
American male dancers